Carlo Alighiero, stage name of Carlo Animali (2 February 1927 – 11 September 2021) was an Italian actor, director, and playwright.

Biography
Animali was born on 2 February 1927 in Ostra. After attending the Brera Academy and the Accademia Nazionale di Arte Drammatica Silvio D'Amico, he made his theatre debut in 1952 in Padua. He began working with the Compagnia dei Giovani in Trieste. In the 1970s, he launched a course in independent theatrical training alongside Elena Cotta, who he met in 1949.

On television, he played the narrator in The Odyssey, directed by Franco Rossi, in 1968. He appeared in Le inchieste del commissario Maigret and in various films by Sergio Martino, Dario Argento, Damiano Damiani, and Lucio Fulci. His popularity in the general public is mainly associated with the role of Sgt. Howard in the television series Giallo club and in its follow-up Ritorna il sergente Sheridan.

Carlo Alighiero died in Rome on 11 September 2021 at the age of 94.

Selected filmography

Cinema
Mon oncle Benjamin (1969)
The Five Man Army (1969)
 (1970)
The Strange Vice of Mrs. Wardh (1971)
Milano trema: la polizia vuole giustizia (1973)
The Suspicious Death of a Minor (1975)
Silent Action (1975)
Gambling City (1975)
The Tough Ones (1976)

Television
The Odyssey (1968)
Le inchieste del commissario Maigret (1964–1972)

References

1927 births
2021 deaths
People from the Province of Ancona
Brera Academy alumni
Italian male film actors
Italian male stage actors
Italian male radio actors
Italian male voice actors
Italian male television actors
20th-century Italian male actors
21st-century Italian male actors
Italian theatre directors
Italian film directors
Italian male dramatists and playwrights
20th-century Italian dramatists and playwrights
21st-century Italian dramatists and playwrights
Italian artistic directors
Accademia Nazionale di Arte Drammatica Silvio D'Amico alumni